Relangi is a village in Iragavaram Mandal of West Godavari District in Andhra Pradesh (post code 534225). It is 5.903 km from its Mandal main town Iragavaram, 74 km from the Rajahmundry and 138 km from the city of Vijayawada.

This village is very peaceful and surrounded by paddy fields. This village has two deities, popularly known as Sri Peda Mantalamba and Sri China Mantalamba. This village has mythological history connected to Ramayana time. Legends say that these two deities were emerged from the yagna kunda conducted by the Brahmarshi Vishwamitra which was guarded by the Princes Rama and Lakshmana. Name of the village came from the name of the lady demon Tataki whose death happened in the hands of Rama before commencing yagna by Vishwamitra. Head of Tataki fell in this place so the name of this place has become "Raalindi (fallen in telugu)", later it became Relangi due to pronunciation problems of Britishers. To support this story village has a Shiva temple named as "Taatakeswaraswaamy" which was said to be installed by Prince Rama as a means of praayaschitta (atone for) towards killing of woman Demon.

Transport 
Local trains running between Nidadavolu and Bhimavaram stop in this village. Bus facility is also available between Tanuku and Bhimavaram.

References

Villages in West Godavari district